Mauro Bollino (born 31 December 1994) is an Italian professional footballer who plays as a winger for Serie D club Casertana.

Club career
On 1 August 2021, he joined Audace Cerignola in Serie D. On 14 October 2021, his contract was terminated by mutual consent for family reasons. On the same day, he signed with Lamezia Terme, also in Serie D. In July 2022, he signed for Serie D club Casertana.

References

External links

1994 births
Living people
Footballers from Palermo
Italian footballers
Italy youth international footballers
Association football midfielders
Serie C players
Serie D players
Palermo F.C. players
Pisa S.C. players
Calcio Foggia 1920 players
S.S. Fidelis Andria 1928 players
Taranto F.C. 1927 players
Paganese Calcio 1926 players
A.S.D. Sicula Leonzio players
U.S. Bitonto players
A.C.R. Messina players
S.S.D. Audace Cerignola players
F.C. Lamezia Terme players